The Lethbridge Viaduct, commonly known as the High Level Bridge, was constructed between 1907 and 1909 at Lethbridge, Alberta, Canada at a cost of $1,334,525.

Overview 

This massive steel trestle over the Oldman River was designed by the Canadian Pacific Railway's bridge department in Montreal, Quebec. The field work was directed by CPR's Assistant Chief Engineer John Edward Schwitzer. The steel work was manufactured by the Canadian Bridge Company of Walkerville, Ontario. A 100-man gang worked on the erection of the steel. Although there were some initial problems with settlement, the bridge has proved to be an enduring engineering work and is still in use today.

This bridge is the largest railway structure in Canada and the largest of its type in the world. It was built as part of a major diversion of the Crowsnest Pass route between Lethbridge and Fort Macleod.

History 
The old approach was over steep grades that hampered operations. In addition, extensive cuts and many other bridges were needed to cross various creeks and coulees. Past the St. Mary River crossing, several large cuts had been required. The trestles on the original line out of Lethbridge totalled .

Although the original route accomplished its purpose in allowing the CPR to rapidly complete the railway, it turned out to be expensive to operate.  The original bridges were designed to last only about 10 years. The CPR decided, in 1905 to construct a completely new route on a better gradient to bypass the original line. The new line was built to the north of the Oldman River. It required two bridges, one in Lethbridge—the High Level Bridge—over the Oldman River and another large bridge over the Oldman River again west of Monarch. This route eliminated many curves and reduced the grade from 1.2 percent to only 0.4 percent. It also saved  of track.

Construction began in the summer of 1907. Clearing and grading the site, construction of piers, and placement of the footings progressed while the steelwork was being prefabricated. Raising the steelwork began in mid-August 1908. Once the steelwork reached track level at the Lethbridge end, it was possible to begin using a huge travelling crane called an "erection traveller". The traveller was built on site at a cost of $100,000. It was used to lower the steel beams and girders into place. The last girder was placed in June 1909 and riveting was completed in August 1909. Transport of the steel to the site required 645 railway cars while another 40 were needed to bring in equipment.

The bridge appears in the 4th episode of the 2023 TV series The Last of Us. Through videographic editing, the bridge is depicted as abandoned for decades and collapsed in the middle.

Specifications 

 Length: 
 Materials:  of steel
 Deck spans and lengths:
 44 plate girder spans each of 
 22 plate girder spans each of 
 one riveted lattice-truss of 
 Rigid braced steel towers: total of 33

See also 
 List of bridges in Canada

References

External links 

 Video clip of historic photos
 Photo Collection of Bridge
 Canadian Society of Civil Engineers History
 
 
 
 
 
 
 
 
 
 

Canadian Pacific Railway bridges in Canada
Railway bridges in Alberta
Bridges completed in 1909
History of Lethbridge
Transport in Lethbridge
Buildings and structures in Lethbridge
Viaducts in Canada